Tawanda Manyimo (Born 1981) is a Zimbabwean-born New Zealand actor.

Manyimo was born in Bulawayo and educated at Tennyson Primary School, and Milton High School.

Manyimo left his job in logistics in Zimbabwe in 2003, and migrated to New Zealand at the age of 22. Manyimo graduated from Toi Whakaari: New Zealand Drama School in 2011 with a Bachelor of Performing Arts (Acting).

He lives in Titirangi.

Selected filmography
The Rover (2014)
Ghost in the Shell (2017)
The Meg (2018)

References

External links

Living people
New Zealand male film actors
Zimbabwean male film actors
21st-century New Zealand male actors
Year of birth missing (living people)
Toi Whakaari alumni